This page details the fixtures, results and statistics between the Wellington Phoenix and their A-League opposition (from N to Z) since the Phoenix joined the competition in the 2007–08 season.

For results and statistics for opposition from A to M, see Wellington Phoenix FC results by opposition (A-M).

All-time A-League results
Includes finals results; does not include pre-season matches or FFA Cup matches.

Overall record

Home/away record

All-time opposition goal scorers
Goals scored against the Wellington Phoenix.Excludes pre-season matches.

Newcastle Jets

Statistics

Results summary

Leading goal scorers

Discipline

Matches

North Queensland Fury

Statistics

Results summary

Leading goal scorers

Discipline

Matches

Perth Glory

Statistics

Results summary

Leading goal scorers

Discipline

Matches

Sydney FC

Statistics

Results summary

Leading goal scorers

Discipline

Matches

Western Sydney Wanderers

Statistics

Results summary

Leading goal scorers

Discipline

Matches

References

External links

results